On 20 November 1943, simultaneous landings were made by United States Marine Corps forces on Tarawa and  United States Army forces on Makin, two coral atolls located in the Gilbert Islands chain in the South-Central Pacific.

Unlike at the Allied landings on Guadalcanal the previous fall, the Japanese chose to violently oppose the Marines on the beach at Betio, the principal island of the Tarawa Atoll. These extremely well-planned defenses, combined with unexpected tidal conditions, made the fight for Tarawa one of the most difficult for the Marine Corps of the entire Pacific Theater.

Makin was declared secure on 25 November, Tarawa on 27 November.

The naval forces assigned to capture the Gilberts formed the largest armada yet assembled by either side in the Pacific, considerably larger than the Allied force that mounted the invasion of Guadalcanal and dwarfing the Japanese force that attacked Pearl Harbor.

TF 50 – Carrier Force (Task Force 50):
 6 fleet carriers, 5 light carriers, 6 fast battleships, 3 heavy cruisers, 3 anti-aircraft light cruisers, 21 destroyers

TF 52 – Northern Attack Force (Makin) (Task Force 52):
 3 escort carriers, 4 old battleships, 4 heavy cruisers, 15 destroyers, 1 minesweeper, 5 transports, 4 landing ships

TF 53 – Southern Attack Force (Tarawa) (Task Force 53):
 5 escort carriers, 3 old battleships, 2 heavy cruisers, 2 light cruisers, 22 destroyers, 2 minesweepers, 16 transports, 4 landing ships

Command structure

Naval 
The roles of Commander in Chief, Pacific Ocean Areas (CINCPOA) and Commander in Chief, U.S. Pacific Fleet (CINCPAC), were both exercised by Admiral Chester W. Nimitz from his headquarters at Pearl Harbor, Hawaii.

Since the Gilberts and Marshalls lie in the Central Pacific, their capture was the responsibility of the U.S. Fifth Fleet, led by Vice Admiral Raymond A. Spruance from aboard his flagship, heavy cruiser Indianapolis.

The ships and troops of Operations Galvanic (landings on Tarawa Atoll) and Kourbash (landings on Makin Atoll) were under direct operational command of Rear Admiral Richmond Kelly Turner aboard old battleship Pennsylvania.

In case Admiral Mineichi Koga attempted to disrupt Fifth Fleet's operations, Spruance was to strip all combat ships not needed to cover the landings, join with the fast carrier forces and engage the Japanese. In the event, Koga's Combined Fleet never stirred from its anchorage at Truk Lagoon in the Carolines.

Ground troops 
V Amphibious Corps (Maj. Gen. Holland M. Smith)
 Tarawa: 2nd Marine Division (Maj. Gen. Julian C. Smith)
 Makin: 27th Infantry Division (Army) (Maj. Gen. Ralph C. Smith)

Both Admiral Turner and General Holland Smith sailed with the Northern Attack Force even though it was obvious that Tarawa would be the scene of the main ground action. If the Japanese mounted a counterattack, it was most likely to come from the Marshalls since the closest Japanese bases to the Gilberts were located there. Nimitz and Spruance wanted the two highest-ranking officers to sail with the forces that would be the first to encounter any such enemy response. Unbeknownst to the Americans, the Japanese had stripped almost all their naval and air assets from the Marshalls in an attempt to resist the Allied effort in the Central Solomons. Thus, no counterattack materialized.

Forces afloat

Carrier Force (Task Force 50) 
Rear Admiral Charles A. Pownall in fleet carrier Yorktown

Carrier Interceptor Group (Task Group 50.1) 

Rear Admiral Pownall in Yorktown

 2 fleet carriers
  (Capt. J. J. Clark)
 Air Group 5 (Lt. Cmdr. C. L. Crommelin)
 VF-5: 36 Grumman F6F Hellcat fighters
 VB-5: 36 Douglas SBD Dauntless dive bombers
 VT-5: 18 Grumman TBF Avenger torpedo bombers
  (Capt. F. B. Stump)
 Air Group 16 (Lt. Cmdr. E. M. Snowden)
 VF-16: 36 Grumman F6F Hellcat fighters
 VB-16: 36 Douglas SBD Dauntless dive bombers
 VT-16: 18 Grumman TBF Avenger torpedo bombers
 1 light carrier
  (Capt. R. P. McConnell)
 Air Group 25 (Lt. R. H. Price)
 VF-25: 24 Grumman F6F Hellcat fighters
   VF-6: 12 Grumman F6F Hellcat fighters
 VC-25: 10 Grumman TBF Avenger torpedo bombers
 Battleship Division 6 (Rear Adm. E. W. Hanson)
 3 fast battleships
 1 North Carolina-class (9 × 16-in. main battery): 
 2 South Dakota-class (9 × 16-in. main battery): , 
 Screen (Lr. Cmdr. A. J. Hill)
 6 destroyers

Northern Carrier Group (Task Group 50.2) 

Rear Admiral Arthur W. Radford in fleet carrier Enterprise
 1 fleet carrier
  (Capt. S. P. Ginder)
 Air Group 6 (Lt. Cmdr. E. H. O'Hare)
 VF-2: 36 Grumman F6F Hellcat fighters
 VB-6: 36 Douglas SBD Dauntless dive bombers
 VT-6: 18 Grumman TBF Avenger torpedo bombers
 2 light carriers
  (Capt. A. M. Pride)
 Air Group 24 (Cmdr. R. H. Dale)
 VF-24: 26 Grumman F6F Hellcat fighters
   VF-6: 12 Grumman F6F Hellcat fighters
 VC-22B: 9 Grumman TBF Avenger torpedo bombers
  (Capt. L. T. Hundt)
 Air Group 30 (Lt. Cmdr. J. G. Sliney, USNR)
 VF-30: 24 Grumman F6F Hellcat fighters
 VC-30:  9 Grumman TBF Avenger torpedo bombers
 Battleship Division 6 (Rear Adm. G. B. Davis)
 3 fast battleships
 1 North Carolina-class (9 × 16-in. main battery): 
 2 South Dakota-class (9 × 16-in. main battery): , 
 Screen (Cmdr. H. F. Miller)
 6 destroyers

Southern Carrier Group (Task Group 50.3) 

Rear Admiral Alfred E. Montgomery in fleet carrier Essex

 2 fleet carriers
  (Capt. D. B. Duncan)
 Air Group 9 (Cmdr. J. Raby)
 VF-9: 36 Grumman F6F Hellcat fighters
 VB-9: 36 Douglas SBD Dauntless dive bombers
 VT-9: 18 Grumman TBF Avenger torpedo bombers
  (Capt. J. J. Ballentine)
 Air Group 17 (Cmdr. M. P. Bagdanovitch)
 VF-18: 36 Grumman F6F Hellcat fighters
 VB-17: 32 Curtiss SB2C Helldiver dive bombers
 1 light carrier
  (Capt. R. L. Johnson)
 Air Group 22 (Cmdr. J. M. Peters)
 VF-22: 16 Grumman F6F Hellcat fighters
   VF-6: 12 Grumman F6F Hellcat fighters
 VC-22:  9 Grumman TBF Avenger torpedo bombers
 Cruiser Division 5 (Rear Adm. E. G. Small):
 3 heavy cruisers
 1 Pensacola-class (10 × 8-in. main battery): 
 2 Northampton-class (9 × 8-in. main battery): , 
 1 anti-aircraft light cruiser
 1 Atlanta-class (12 × 5-in. main battery): 
 Screen (Capt. J. T. Bottom):
 5 destroyers

Relief Carrier Group (Task Group 50.4) 

Rear Admiral Frederick C. Sherman in fleet carrier Saratoga
 1 fleet carrier
  (Capt. J. H. Cassady)
 Air Group 3 (Cmdr. H. H. Caldwell)
 VF-12: 37 Grumman F6F Hellcat fighters
 VB-12: 24 Douglas SBD Dauntless dive bombers
 VT-12: 18 Grumman TBF Avenger torpedo bombers
 1 light carrier
  (Capt. G. R. Henderson)
 Air Group 23 (Lt. Cmdr. H. L. Miller)
 VF-23: 24 Grumman F6F Hellcat fighters
 VT-23:   9 Grumman TBF Avenger torpedo bombers
 Cruiser Division 2 (Rear Adm. L. J. Wiltse)
 2 anti-aircraft light cruisers
 Both Atlanta-class (12 × 5-in. main battery): , 
 Screen
 4 destroyers
 1 Benson-class (4 × 5-in. main battery):

Northern Attack Force (Makin) (Task Group 52) 

Rear Admiral Richmond Kelly Turner in old battleship Pennsylvania

Transport Group (Task Group 52.1) 
Captain D. W. Loomis
Embarking 165th Regimental Combat Team and 105th Battalion Landing Team of the  27th Infantry Division
 1 attack cargo ship: 
 1 landing ship dock: 
 Screen
 4 destroyers
 2 Fletcher-class (4 × 5-in. main battery): , 
 1 Farragut-class (4 × 5-in. main battery): 
 1 Sims-class (4 × 5-in. main battery):

Fire Support Group (Task Group 52.2) 
Rear Admiral Robert M. Griffin in fast battleship New Mexico

 Unit 1
 2 old battleships
 1 Pennsylvania-class (12 × 14-in. main battery): 
 1 New Mexico-class (12 × 14-in. main battery): 
 2 heavy cruisers
 Both New Orleans-class (9 × 8-in. main battery): , 
 2 destroyers
 Both Farragut-class (4 × 5-in. main battery): , 
 Unit 2
 2 old battleships
 Both New Mexico-class (12 × 14-in. main battery): , 
 2 heavy cruisers
 1 Baltimore-class (9 × 8-in. main battery): 
 1 New Orleans-class (9 × 8-in. main battery): 
 2 destroyers
 Both Gridley-class (4 × 5-in. main battery): , 
 Unit 3
 2 destroyers
 1 Porter-class (8 × 5-in. main battery): 
 1 Farragut-class (4 × 5-in. main battery):

Air Support Group (Task Group 52.3) 

Rear Admiral Henry M. Mullinnix in escort carrier Liscome Bay
 3 escort carriers
  (Capt. I. D. Wiltsie )
 Air Group (Lt. Cmdr. M. U. Beebe)
 16 Grumman FM-1 Wildcat fighters
 12 TBM Avenger torpedo bombers
  (Capt. H. W. Taylor)
 Air Group (Lt. Cmdr. J. J. Lynch)
 16 Grumman FM-1 Wildcat fighters
 12 Grumman TBF Avenger torpedo bombers
  (Capt. R. L. Bowman)
 Air Group (Lt. Cmdr. G. M. Clifford)
 16 Grumman FM-1 Wildcat fighters
 12 Grumman TBF Avenger torpedo bombers
 Screen
 4 destroyers
 2 Sims-class (4 × 5-in. main battery): , 
 2 Fletcher-class (5 × 5-in. main battery): , 
 1 minesweeper
 1 Auk-class (1 × 3-in. main battery):

Makin LST Group No. 1 (Task Group 54.4) 
Commander A. M. Hurst
 3 landing ship tanks: 31, 78, 178, each carrying an LCT
 1 Farragut-class destroyer (4 × 5-in. main battery):

TF 53 Southern Attack Force (Tarawa) 

Rear Admiral Harry W. Hill in old battleship Maryland

Transport Group (Task Group 53.1) 
Captain H. B. Knowles in attack transport Monrovia
Embarking  2nd Marine Division, reinforced
 Transport Division 4 (Capt. J. B. McGovern):
 Transport Division 6 (Capt. T. B. Brittain):
 Transport Division 18 (Capt. Knowles):
 1 landing ship dock: 
 1 transport: 
 Screen (Capt. E. M. Thompson):
 7 destroyers

Minesweeper Group (Task Group 53.2) 
Lieutenant Commander H. R. Peirce
 2 minesweepers
 Both Auk-class (1 × 3-in. main battery): ,

Fire Support Group (Task Group 53.4) 

Rear Admiral Howard F. Kingman
 Section 1
 1 Tennessee-class old battleship (12 × 14-in. main battery): 
 1 Cleveland-class light cruiser (12 × 6-in. main battery): 
 2 Benson-class destroyers (5 × 5-in. main battery): , 
 Section 2
 1 Colorado-class old battleship] (8 × 16-in. main battery): 
 1 Cleveland-class light cruiser (12 × 6-in. main battery): 
 2 Benson-class destroyers (5 × 5-in. main battery): , 
 Section 3
 1 Colorado-class old battleship] (8 × 16-in. main battery): 
 1 Portland-class heavy cruiser (9 × 8-in. main battery): 
 2 Sims-class destroyers (5 × 5-in. main battery): , 
 Section 4
 2 Fletcher-class destroyers (5 × 5-in. main battery): , 
 Section 5
 1 Portland-class heavy cruiser (9 × 8-in. main battery): 
 1 Fletcher-class destroyer (5 × 5-in. main battery):

Air Support Group (Task Group 53.6) 

Rear Admiral V. H. Ragsdale
 5 escort carriers
  (Capt. E. P. Moore)
 12 Grumman F6F Hellcat fighters
   9 Douglas SBD Dauntless dive bombers
   9 Grumman TBF Avenger torpedo bombers
  (Capt. F. W. McMahon)
 12 Grumman F6F Hellcat fighters
   9 Douglas SBD Dauntless dive bombers
   9 Grumman TBF Avenger torpedo bombers
  (Capt. D. Ketcham)
 12 Grumman F6F Hellcat fighters
   9 Douglas SBD Dauntless dive bombers
   9 Grumman TBF Avenger torpedo bombers
  (Capt. S. J. Michael)
 12 Grumman F6F Hellcat fighters
  (Capt. G. A. Dussault)
 12 Grumman F6F Hellcat fighters
 Screen
 5 destroyers
 2 Fletcher-class (5 × 5-in. main battery): , 

Tarawa LST Group No. 1 (Task Group 54.5) 
Lieutenant Commander R. M. Pits
 3 landing ship tanks: 34, 242, 243, each carrying an LCT
 1 Benson-class destroyer (4 ×x 5-in. main battery):

See also 
Orders of battle involving United States Marine forces in the Pacific Theatre of World War II:
 Battle of Guadalcanal order of battle
 Battle of Saipan order of battle
 Guam (1944) order of battle
 Battle of Leyte opposing forces
 Battle of Peleliu opposing forces
 Battle of Iwo Jima order of battle
 Okinawa ground order of battle
Naval Base Tarawa

Notes

References

Bibliography 
 
 

Gilbert Islands
World War II orders of battle
Marshall Islands in World War II
Pacific Ocean theatre of World War II
Conflicts in 1943
Naval aviation operations and battles
Naval battles of World War II involving the United States
United States Navy in World War II